Apriona unidentata is a species of beetle in the family Cerambycidae. It was described by Pic in 1936. It is known from Vietnam.

References

Batocerini
Beetles described in 1936